Irina Filatova (born 8 August 1978, Novosibirsk) is a Russian political figure and a deputy of the 8th State Duma.
 
After graduating from the Siberian Academy of Public Administration, Filatova became a Russian Federal Bar Association member. She led a private law practice specializing in civil law relations. In 2007, she joined the Communist Party of the Russian Federation. In 2008, she became a member of the Youth Public Chamber of Russia. From 2011 to 2018, she was an advisor to the deputy of the 6th and 7th State Dumas Yury Afonin. From 2018 to 2021, she worked as an advisor on legal questions to Gennady Zyuganov. Since September 2021, she has served as deputy of the 8th State Duma.

References
 

 

1978 births
Living people
Communist Party of the Russian Federation members
21st-century Russian politicians
Eighth convocation members of the State Duma (Russian Federation)
21st-century Russian women politicians
Politicians from Novosibirsk